Ardozyga amphiplaca is a species of moth in the family Gelechiidae. It was described by Edward Meyrick in 1932. It is found in New Guinea.

References

Ardozyga
Moths described in 1932
Moths of New Guinea